Rainbow Kitten Surprise is an alternative rock indie band, featuring lead vocalist Ela Melo, Darrick "Bozzy" Keller (guitar, backup vocals), Ethan Goodpaster (electric guitar), Jess Haney (drums), and Charlie Holt (bass). The band formed in Boone, North Carolina. (Robbinsville, North Carolina is the hometown of Jess Haney and Ethan Goodpaster.)  
Rainbow Kitten Surprise, "RKS" for short, is known for its harmonies, instrumentation, and lyrics. Their sound has been influenced by artists such as Modest Mouse, Kings of Leon, Frank Ocean and Schoolboy Q.

History
Rainbow Kitten Surprise was formed in 2013 by Ela Melo and Darrick Keller. The two wrote and composed music together as they attended Appalachian State University. The band name was created by a friend who was on a morphine drip at the time, recently out of surgery. Their first EP, Mary, was recorded in a dorm room at the university. They later added three new members, Ethan Goodpaster, Jess Haney, and Charlie Holt. RKS independently released its first album, Seven, which was later re-released together with the band's first EP as a joint album called Seven + Mary. RKS initially recorded its music under the Split Rail Records label, a student run label at Appalachian State University's Hayes School of Music, where three of the band's members attended. From 2014 through 2017, Rainbow Kitten Surprise has performed at multiple music festivals and other events, including Bonnaroo Music and Arts Festival and Austin City Limits Festival.

On April 6, 2018, RKS released its How To: Friend, Love, Freefall album, under the Elektra Records label. It features 13 tracks, including the single "Hide", the music video of which depicts four drag queens coming out to their families. The single "Fever Pitch" from the album climbed to number 34th on Billboards Alternative Songs chart in spring 2018. In spring and summer 2018, the group toured the US and Canada to promote the album.

In April 2019, RKS performed at several venues across North Carolina to raise funds for Equality NC, the country's oldest statewide LGBT equality organization.

In May 2019, RKS released Mary (B-Sides), consisting of a studio recording of "Heart" (a song originally released via YouTube and SoundCloud in 2014) and the track "No Vacancy".

In June 2019, they performed at the legendary Red Rocks Amphitheater, which they sold out in seven days. This was the last stop on their summer tour.

In January 2020, the long-running PBS show Austin City Limits aired Rainbow Kitten Surprise in a half-hour set recorded the previous fall.

On July 14, 2020, RKS played a livestream concert. This was their first of the year because of the cancellation of many events due to the COVID-19 pandemic.

On October 9, 2020, Rainbow Kitten Surprise released the single "Our Song", which had been previously played at multiple live events. This single marked their first release as a band since May 2019.

On August 13, 2021, Rainbow Kitten Surprise released the live album RKS! Live from Athens Georgia. It included a collection of 25 songs performed at a previous live concert.

On March 23, 2022, the band announced a new single, "Work Out" off their upcoming album.

On March 30, 2022, the band's lead singer came out as transgender.

On April 6, 2022, Rainbow Kitten Surprise released the single "Work Out," their first new single released in nearly 18 months.

Discography

Studio albums

Music videos 
 "Devil Like Me" (March 1, 2014)
 "Cocaine Jesus" (May 1, 2015)
 "Bare Bones" (May 3, 2015)
 "Fever Pitch" (January 16, 2018)
 "Holy War" (February 23, 2018)
 "Hide" (April 3, 2018)
 "It's Called: Freefall" (January 28, 2019)
 "Work Out" (June 16, 2022)

References

Indie rock musical groups from North Carolina
2013 establishments in North Carolina
Musical groups established in 2013